Doce may refer to:
Doce, a Portuguese band
Doce (sweet), a Goan sweet
Twelve, in Spanish
 Doce River in Brazil
 Doce River (Goiás)
 Doce River (Rio Grande do Norte)